Dehmolla (also Romanized as Dehmollā, Deh-e Mollā, and Deh-i-Mulla; also known as Kalāteh-ye Mollā) is a village in Dehmolla Rural District, in the Central District of Shahrud County, Semnan Province, Iran. At the 2006 census, its population was 1,138, in 356 families.

References 

Populated places in Shahrud County